Adam Iwiński (1958 – 4 December 2010, Warsaw, Poland) was a Polish film director, cinematographer, and actor.

Iwiński began his cinematography career in the mid-1980s and was the assistant director and second director, among others, on films such as: Jezioro Bodenskie, Pułkownik Kwiatkowski, Hero of the Year and A Chronicle of Amorous Accidents. After 2000, he teamed up with production company MTL Maxfilm, for which he worked on the films Just Love Me and Zróbmy sobie wnuka. He was also a co-founder of the soap opera M jak miłość, and directed more than 30 episodes.

He died suddenly in Warsaw. On 17 December, Iwiński was buried at the Służew Old Cemetery in Warsaw.

Filmography 
 1984: Zabawa w chowanego - współpraca reżyserska
 1985: Jezioro Bodeńskie - współpraca reżyserska
 1985: Kronika wypadków miłosnych - współpraca reżyserska
 1986: Bohater roku - współpraca reżyserska
 1986: Nieproszony gość - współpraca reżyserska
 1989: Janka - reżyseria (odc. 7–9), II reżyser
 1990: Janka - II reżyser
 1991: V.I.P. - II reżyser
 1991: Les enfants de la guerre - asystent reżysera
 1992: Szwadron - współpraca reżyserska
 1993: Czterdziestolatek. 20 lat później - reżyseria (odc. 12), II reżyser
 1993: Wow - II reżyser
 1995: Pułkownik Kwiatkowski - II reżyser
 1995: Sukces - obsada aktorska (odc. 1), II reżyser
 1997: Musisz żyć - II reżyser
 1997: Sława i chwała - II reżyser
 1997: Szczęśliwego Nowego Jorku - II reżyser
 1998: Gosia i Małgosia - współpraca reżyserska
 1999: Tygrysy Europy - obsada aktorska, II reżyser
 2000-2010: M jak miłość - reżyseria, II reżyser, obsada aktorska (odc. 65, 78, 348, 487)
 2000: Przeprowadzki - II reżyser
 2000: Twarze i maski - obsada aktorska (odc. 6)
 2001: Garderoba damska - reżyseria (odc. 5)
 2001: Gulczas, a jak myślisz... - współpraca reżyserska
 2001: Myszka Walewska - reżyseria
 2001: Przeprowadzki - kierowca ciężarówki
 2003: Tygrysy Europy 2
 2003: Zróbmy sobie wnuka - II reżyser
 2006: Tylko mnie kochaj - II reżyser

References
 Adam Iwiński at Filmweb
 Adam Iwiński at FilmPolski

Polish film directors
Polish cinematographers
1958 births
2010 deaths
Film people from Warsaw
Burials at Służew Old Cemetery